Granada Club de Fútbol, S.A.D., known simply as Granada, is a Spanish football club based in the city of Granada, in the autonomous community of Andalusia, that plays in the Segunda División, after being relegated from La Liga in the 2021–22 season. Its main shareholder is the Chinese company Desport, and its president Jiang Lizhang. The club was founded in 1931 with the name of Club Recreativo Granada, and plays its home matches at the Nuevo Estadio de Los Cármenes.

Since 17 July 2020 the club is located at position 22 of the historical points classification of the First Division, and 20 of the historical First Division number of seasons classification, where it has participated in 25 seasons and finished in sixth place twice. Granada was the Copa del Rey runner-up in 1959 (the competition was then known as the Copa del Generalísimo). The club finished the 2019–20 season in 7th, qualifying for the first time to the UEFA Europa League, where they were quarter-finalists.

History

Foundation
Granada Club de Fútbol was founded on 6 April 1931, originally as Recreativo de Granada; the first president was Julio López Fernández. It was him who registered the club in the Registry of Associations in the Civil Government and presented the first Board of Directors.

The first football match was played against the Deportivo Jaén on 6 December 1931, which resulted in a 2–1 victory. The first goal in the match, and in the club's history, was scored by Antonio Bombillar. The first home match was played against U.D. Andújar two weeks later. Granada won it 1–0. It took place at Campo de Las Tablas stadium. In the 1931–32 season, the club finished 2nd in the Tercera Regional – Región Sur championship. 4 wins in 6 matches helped Granada achieve promotion to the Segunda Regional. The club started the season in a new division with a new president, Gabriel Morcillo Raya. During the 1932–33 season the club had the biggest win in its history, 11–0 against Xerez on 23 April 1933.

La Liga entry and peak
After several promotions, in 1941–42 the club made its La Liga debut. It was the match against the Celta on 28 September 1941. The game ended up in 1–1 draw. The first Granada goal in the highest Spanish division was scored by César Rodríguez Álvarez. During that season the Granada had some historical home wins, among them 8–0 against Real Oviedo and 6–0 against Barcelona. Granada finished the season in the 10th position among 14 teams.

From 1942 until the 1980s, it alternated between the top flight and the Segunda División, with its golden age coming during the late 1960s and mid 70s, as the Andalusian club had eight consecutive top flight seasons between 1968–69 and 1975–76 and made the Copa del Rey semi and quarter-finals on 4 occasions. These seasons also included a best-ever sixth league places in the 1971–72 and 1973–74 seasons. Granada finished the 1971–72 season with 9 wins in the last 10 home games, with powerhouses Barcelona and Real Madrid being among those wins.

In 1959 Granada achieved its greatest landmark, being the runner-up of the Copa del Generalísimo (later Copa del Rey). In the final, played at the Santiago Bernabéu Stadium, the team lost to Barcelona 4–1. The only goal for Granada was scored by the Argentinian forward Ramón Carranza.

In the 1980s, Granada had some brief appearances in the second division. In 1983–84, they finished 8th among 20 teams in the Segunda División, just 10 points away from the champion the Real Madrid Castilla and the runner-up the Bilbao Athletic. In 1984–85, Granada finished 18th and were relegated to the Segunda División B; in the same season, the club was eliminated by fourth-tier club Estepona in the second round of the Copa del Rey. Although the club returned to the Segunda División after two years for the 1987–88 season, it was relegated again that same season after finishing 19th.

Decline and revival
Granada spent most of the following seasons in the Segunda División B, and were relegated to the fourth tier in 2002–03, due to failing to pay its players under the presidency of Francisco Jimena. After four seasons in the fourth division, former Real Madrid president Lorenzo Sanz, along with his son Paco, arrived at the club. With their help, the Andalusian side was again promoted to the third category but got itself into serious financial trouble. In the 2005–06 season Granada won Group 9 of the Tercera División and qualified for the promotional play-offs, where the first rival was Linense. After the two games ended up in 1–1 draws, Granada won in the penalty shootout. After that they had to face Guadalajara, winning 3–1 on aggregate, which gave them promotion to the third tier.

In 2006–07, Granada played in Group IV of the third level after four seasons in the Tercera. The president Paco Sanz, with the massive support of the fans, continued to lead the project with the intention of bringing the team to the top division, but the lack of time after the promotion led to hasty actions. In July 2009, the club was in such financial difficulty that it was on the brink of dissolving. The solution to the crisis came with the signing of a partnership agreement between Granada and Udinese Calcio, with the Spaniards incorporating large numbers of players contracted to the Italian club as well as receiving its youth players and reserves as part of the agreement. At the end of the season, Granada won its group and then got promoted by beating Alcorcón in the play-offs, returning to the second division after 22 years.

In 2010–11, Granada finished in fifth position, with most of the players loaned by Udinese still on board. On 18 June 2011, the club became the first winner of the promotion play-offs – a different system was used from 1985 to 1999 – after successively defeating Celta de Vigo (1–1, penalty shootout) and Elche (1–1 on aggregate, away goals rule), thus returning to the top division after a 35-year absence.

In June 2016, Chinese businessman Jiang Lizhang became the new owner of the club, buying the Pozzo family's controlling stake. After surviving in the top flight for six seasons, the team was relegated in 2016–17 after being defeated by Real Sociedad.

Under new manager Diego Martínez, Granada returned to the top flight as runners-up to CA Osasuna in the 2018–19 Segunda División. The following season, the team finished 7th in the top flight, earning qualification for the UEFA Europa League, the first time the club qualified for any European competition. It also reached the Copa del Rey semi-finals for the first time in 50 years, narrowly losing to Athletic Bilbao on away goals after a 2–2 aggregate draw. They reached the quarter-finals in Europe, being eliminated by Manchester United. On 22 May 2022, the team was relegated after a draw against Espanyol.

Seasons

26 seasons in La Liga
34 seasons in the Segunda División
22 seasons in the Segunda División B
5 seasons in the Tercera División
2 seasons in the Categorías Regionales

Players

Current squad
.

Reserve team

Out on loan

Current technical staff

   Alejandro Gutiérrez
   José Gutiérrez

   Alberto Vera   Juan Sánchez   Fernando García

   Miguel García

Honours

National
Segunda División (3): 1940–41, 1956–57, 1967–68
Segunda División B (3): 1982–83, 1999–00, 2009–10
Tercera División (3): 1933–34, 2003–04, 2005–06
Copa del Rey Runners-up: 1958–59

Regional tournaments
 Andalucia Cup: 1932–33
 Andalucia Championship reservations: 1971–72

Friendly

Antonio Puerta Trophy: 2010

Individual

Pichichi Trophy
La Liga: Enrique Porta (1971–72)
Segunda División: Miguel (1964–65), Rafa (1955–56)

European record

Derby of eastern Andalusia

The Eastern Andalusia Derby is played between Granada and Málaga.

Stats are updated to derby #86 played on 17 January 2021 (Copa del Rey, last 16)

Stadium

After its foundation, the team played its home matches at the Campo de Las Tablas, inaugurated on 20 December 1931. On that day Granada CF won the match against the U.D. Andújar 1–0 in the Tercera Regional. Granada's stay at this ground was a short one; on 23 December 1934, a new municipal stadium, Estadio Los Cármenes, was opened. The club played in this stadium until 1995 when they moved to the Nuevo Los Cármenes Stadium (also owned by the Ayuntamiento de Granada). It was inaugurated on 16 May 1995, with a friendly fixture between Real Madrid and Bayer Leverkusen, whereas Granada CF played for the first time in the Summer of 1995, playing a friendly fixture against Real Betis. The stadium featured an original capacity of 16,212 seats. This was expanded to 22,524 after Granada CF's promotion to La Liga in the summer of 2011.

After achieving promotion to the First Division in 2019, the stadium has been renovated, such as the replacement of the playing surface, the repairing and painting of seats plus the addition of white seats to form the words "Granada Cf" across from the main stand and "1931" on the South Stand, the expansion of the official club store (now located on the corner where the old tickets office was located), and finally, the replacement of the illumination system in line with the lighting requirements of LaLiga. In addition, the club is working with Granada's council to get a deal for a long-lasting tenancy with the aim of performing a series of investments like a re-build of the stadium corners (which had been previously dismantled), establish shopping and entertainment zones or the expansion and refurbishment of sponsor and advertising areas.

Dimensions: 105 × 68 meters
Address: C/ Pintor Manuel Maldonado s/n
Inauguration date: 16 May 1995, Real Madrid–Bayer Leverkusen (1–0)
First Granada CF match: 22 August 1995, Granada–Real Betis (4–1) XXIII Granada Trophy

Kit and colours

Upon its foundation, the club's kits were a shirt with blue and white vertical stripes and white shorts. After the Spanish Civil War the club owners went to Madrid to buy new ones, but they couldn't find other than red and white striped shirts. That became the official colour scheme from then on.

In the 1970s, the club changed the vertical stripes to horizontal. The kit alternated horizontal and vertical strip patterns until 2004–05, when a member assembly decided to settle for the horizontal pattern.

Shirt sponsors and manufacturers

Coaches

 Lippo Hertzka (1934–1935)
 Gaspar Rubio (1939–1940)
 Antonio Bonet Silvestre (1941–1943)
 Francisco Bru (1941–1943)
 István Plattkó (1943–1945)
 Gaspar Rubio (1950)
 Alejandro Scopelli (1957–1959)
 Jenő Kalmár (1958–1960)
 Fernando Argila Pazzaglia (1960–1961)
 Francisco Trinchant (1961)
 Heriberto Herrera (1961–1962)
 Ignacio Eizaguirre (1963–1964)
 Francisco Antúnez (1963–1964)
 Jenő Kalmár (1965–1966)
 Marcel Domingo (1968–1969)
 Joseíto (1970–1972)
 Pasieguito (1972–1973)
 Joseíto (1973–1975)
 Miguel Muñoz (1975–1976)
 Héctor Núñez (1976)
 Vavá (1977–1978)
 Francisco Gento (1980–1981)
 José Mingorance (1981)
 Antonio Ruiz (1981–1982)
 Manuel Ruiz Sosa (1982–1983)
 Felipe Mesones (1983–1984)
 Nando Yosu (1984)
 Joaquín Peiró (1985–1988)
 Manuel Ruiz Sosa (1988)
 Pachín (1988–1989)
 José Enrique Díaz (1989–1990)
 Nando Yosu (1992–1994)
 Lucas Alcaraz (1995–1998)
 Paco Chaparro (1998–1999)
 Felipe Mesones (2000)
 Ismael Díaz (2000)
 José Ángel Moreno (2001)
 Ramón Blanco (2001–2002)
 Josip Višnjić (2006–2007)
 Óscar Cano (2007–2009)
 Pedro Braojos (2008–2009)
 Fabri (2010–2012)
 Abel Resino (2012)
 Juan Antonio Anquela (2012–2013)
 Lucas Alcaraz (2013–2014)
 Joaquín Caparrós (2014–2015)
 Joseba Aguado (interim) (2015)
 Abel Resino (2015)
 José Ramón Sandoval (2015–2016)
 José González (2016)
 Paco Jémez (2016)
 Lucas Alcaraz (2016–2017)
 Tony Adams (2017)
 José Luis Oltra (2017–2018)
 Pedro Morilla Pineda (2018)
 Miguel Ángel Portugal (2018)
 Diego Martínez (2018–2021)
 Robert Moreno (2021–2022)
 Rubén Torrecilla (interim) (2022)
 Aitor Karanka (2022–)

References

External links

Official website 
Official website 
Futbolme team profile 
BDFutbol team profile
Unofficial website 

 
Football clubs in Andalusia
Association football clubs established in 1931
Sport in Granada
1931 establishments in Spain
La Liga clubs
Segunda División clubs